Meung-sur-Loire is a commune in the Loiret department, north-central France.

It was the site of the Battle of Meung-sur-Loire in 1429.

Geography
Meung-sur-Loire lies 15 km to the west of Orléans on the north bank of the river Loire at the confluence with the river Mauves. The Mauves, actually three rivers, have their source in the water table of the productive agricultural region of the Beauce.

History

There is evidence of mesolithic settlements at « Mousseau » and « La Haute-Murée ».

A Gallo-Roman fortified village recorded as Magdunum was built in the marais adjoining the river, which in 409 was fired by the invading Alans. The marais was drained, according to tradition by Saint Liphard around the year 520. The canalisation formed the watercourses known as the mauves. He went on to build the chapel which was to become the monastery and the abbey. His relics were deposited in the church in 1104, the year after Louis VI had founded as fortress.

During the 12th century the church was rebuilt in the gothic style, and fortified accommodation for the abbot built alongside.
Jeanne d'Arc visited in 1429, and this was the site of the Battle of Meung-sur-Loire. The complex was restored in 1570, again during the 19th century and again in 1985.

The river defined the town, in 1857, 38 mills had the right to use the waters of the rivers to power themselves.

Population

Fiction
In fiction, it has been described by Alexandre Dumas in The Three Musketeers as the village where d'Artagnan, en route to join the King's Musketeers in Paris, first encounters the villainous Comte de Rochefort.
Also in fiction, Meung-sur-Loire is the country home of Chief Inspector Jules Maigret, Georges Simenon's classic crime fiction character. Maigret and his wife Louise eventually retire to their Meung-sur-Loire home, where he spends his time fishing (pike), and she tends, according to her sister, any number of animals.

Points of interest
 The town is twinned with Lymm in Cheshire, England
 Arboretum des Prés des Culands
 Château de Meung-sur-Loire

Notable residents
 Jean de Meun (c. 1240 – c. 1305), author of the Roman de la Rose
 Maurice Larrouy (1882–1939), winner of the 1917 Prix Femina, died in Meung

See also
 Communes of the Loiret department

References 

Meungsurloire
Carnutes